Paul Finebaum is an American sports author, former columnist, and television-radio personality. His primary focus is sports, particularly those in the Southeast. After many years as a reporter, columnist, and sports-talk radio host in the Birmingham area, Finebaum was hired by ESPN in 2013 for its new SEC Network.  He produces a radio show out of the network's regional base in Charlotte, North Carolina.

Career

News reporter
Finebaum arrived in Birmingham in 1980 and became a columnist and reporter for the Birmingham Post-Herald. Finebaum's work has earned him more than 250 national, regional, and area sports writing awards, including his stories on the recruitment of Alabama basketball player Buck Johnson. In 1993, he broke the story of Antonio Langham, a University of Alabama football player who signed a contract with a sports agent while playing for the school, which led to an NCAA probation for the school. Finebaum joined the Mobile Press Register in 2001 where he wrote a twice-weekly (later weekly) column with the column syndicated to other newspapers. Finebaum discontinued the column in December 2010. On September 1, Finebaum returned to writing with his first column for Sports Illustrated.

Radio career

Early career
Finebaum started his radio appearances in the mid-1980s by giving morning commentary on the Mark and Brian Radio Show on WAPI-FM (I-95). After starting his own afternoon radio show a few years later on WAPI-AM, his program quickly became the highest-rated sport-talk show in Birmingham. In October 1993, Finebaum moved his sports-talk show to WERC.

The Paul Finebaum Radio Network
In 2001, Finebaum, along with Network Director Pat Smith and Producer Johnny Brock, launched The Paul Finebaum Radio Network, syndicated with affiliates across the southeast. It was named in 2004 by Sports Illustrated as one of the top 12 sports radio shows in the United States. In January 2007, his radio show moved to WJOX.

Finebaum found himself embroiled at the center of one of biggest college sports stories in America in 2011 – the poisoning of the famous trees on Toomer's Corner at Auburn University. The man charged, Harvey Updyke, called the Finebaum show, claiming to have poisoned the trees. The audio of the call was played on nearly every national radio show and television newscast in the nation. In the aftermath, Finebaum was featured on the NBC Nightly News with Brian Williams, appeared on CNN, ESPN, MSNBC, and several other networks. He also was blamed by many for the event including one caller saying "if anything else happens, there will be blood on your hands." On April 21, Updyke appeared again on the Finebaum show, speaking publicly for the first time since the incident, breaking his long silence. The interview, perhaps the most listened to ever in the history of the Finebaum show, made national news, appearing in publications ranging from The New York Times to ESPN's SportsCenter. Updyke ended the 45-minute interview with his signature Roll Damn Tide.

ESPN
Finebaum's show went off the air on WJOX temporarily on January 21, 2013, when his contract with Cumulus and WJOX expired. The New Yorker reported he "had talks with ESPN and CBS, about joining their national radio networks, and with SiriusXM, about moving permanently to satellite."

In May 2013, Finebaum signed with ESPN to appear on its new SEC Network beginning in 2014, and also hosts a daily radio show based out of Charlotte.

Television
Finebaum's television contributions have been numerous. In Birmingham he currently appears as a sports analyst for WBRC. He was sports director for WIAT-TV from 1998 to 2002 and co-hosted individual shows on WVTM-TV and WBMA.

Finebaum also had a leading role in ESPN's documentary Roll Tide/War Eagle. The producers used Finebaum and his program as the voice of the documentary, which debuted on November 8, 2011.

As part of the deal Finebaum signed with ESPN in May 2013, he agreed to appear on its new SEC Network starting in 2014, hosting The Paul Finebaum Show in simulcast for ESPN Radio. As an extension of the radio show, Finebaum has also hosted special broadcasts on SEC Network as part of ESPN Megacasts involving SEC teams—the Finebaum Film Room—particularly during College Football Playoff National Championship games.

Publications
Finebaum's books include his popular I Hate... series, including I Hate Michigan: 303 Reasons Why You Should, Too, and several dozen similarly titled works.

Finebaum's other books include The Worst of Paul Finebaum, a 1994 compilation of some of the newspaper columns he has written; and Finebaum Said, a 2001 collection of columns and interviews.

On March 27, 2013, the Birmingham News reported that Finebaum agreed to an advance (later reported to be $650,000) with HarperCollins to write a book about the radio show. HarperCollins Senior Vice President and Executive Editor David Hirshey said "We expect this book to occupy the same spot on the best-seller list that Alabama occupies in the BCS rankings – number one." In February, Publishers Weekly reported the book would arrive on August 5 with a first run of 150,000 copies. The book, which was excerpted in the Wall Street Journal on August 5, quickly made the New York Times best-seller list, landing at No. 6 among sports books. The book remained on the best-seller list for five months.

Recognition

In 2002, Finebaum was named by The Tennessean in Nashville as one of the Southeastern Conference's Top Power Brokers. In July 2009, The Orlando Sentinel named Finebaum as one of the SEC's 10 most powerful people. On January 11, 2011, CNBC's Emmy-Award-winning sports reporter, Darren Rovell wrote: "Back 2 back titles by Alabama & Auburn make Finebaum the most powerful small market sports media member in the nation" and called him "the best listener of any sports talk radio host." In December 2012, Sports Illustrated, in its year-end review of sports media, listed gave Finebaum an Honorable Mention along with 10 other names for "Best National Radio Voice".

Reeves Wiedeman profiled the radio host in a 5,000-word article, "King of the South", in the December 10, 2012 edition of the New Yorker. According to the Wiedeman, it was The New Yorker's first major piece on a college football figure in more than 10 years. Several months later, on February 6, 2013, The Wall Street Journal, in a profile by writer Rachel Bachman, stated: "Paul Finebaum is not only one of the nation's best-known sports-talk radio hosts. He is perhaps college football's best-known voice since TV announcer Keith Jackson retired." The Journal ended the story, referring to Finebaum as "the Oprah Winfrey of college football." On March 6, 2013, Sports Illustrateds Richard Deitsch unveiled a ranking of the 20 Most Powerful People in Sports Media nationally and Finebaum came in at No. 17. In AL.com's 2020 ranking of the 25 most influential people in the SEC, Finebaum ranked No. 6. 

In October 2013, the University of Tennessee presenting Finebaum with the "Accomplished Alumni Award," "which recognizes notable alumni for their success and distinction within their field."

ESPN broadcaster Joe Tessitore said in a December 2018 podcast interview, "If you asked me who are the two greatest interviewers on radio and television, I would say Paul Finebaum and Howard Stern." In the College GameDay episode of Origins, James Andrew Miller said: "Paul Finebaum knows the American Southeast like Jay-Z knows Brooklyn. And that's a big blast of wind at your back if your job is covering college football. His instincts as an interviewer rank him in the top tier of the sports world. And he is beyond mere savvy when it comes to speaking very virally."

Personal life
Finebaum was born in Memphis, Tennessee.  He and his wife Linda Hudson have been married since 1990. Finebaum is Jewish. Finebaum attended Christian Brothers High School and White Station High School in Memphis before graduating from the University of Tennessee, where he received a degree in political science in 1978.

References

 Barnes, Susan. (Summer 2005) "The Devil We Know". Tennessee Alumnus Magazine. Vol. 85, No. 3 – accessed April 16, 2006
 Paul Finebaum is "the most influential sports-talk personality in the Southeast" – Huntsville Times, August 21, 2003.
 "Paul Finebaum, the state's most influential sports columnist and talk-show host" – New York Times, May 4, 2003.
 Fowler, Jeremy. "Finebaum voted as one of the SEC's 10 most powerful people"- "". Orlando Sentinel, July 10, 2009.

External links

Paul Finebaum Official Facebook Page
Paul Finebaum Radio Network official site
Finebaum headed to WJOX, Birmingham News
Cranehill Press "I Hate..." Series
 Paul Finebaum article at BhamWiki.com
Listen to Paul Finebaum Show on RadioJunkee.com

21st-century American Jews
American columnists
American sportswriters
American sports radio personalities
American television personalities
Male television personalities
Writers from Birmingham, Alabama
People from Memphis, Tennessee
Living people
University of Tennessee alumni
Journalists from Alabama
Journalists from Tennessee
Jewish American sportspeople
Year of birth missing (living people)